The 1990 Borders Regional Council election, the fifth election to Borders Regional Council, was held on 3 May 1990 as part of the wider 1990 Scottish regional elections. The election saw the Independents gain a majority on the 23 seat council.

Aggregate results

Ward results

References

1990 Scottish local elections
May 1990 events in the United Kingdom